An Emmy for Megan is a comedy web series created, directed, written, and starring Megan Amram. It depicts Amram's quest to win an Emmy by meeting the minimum standards to qualify for a nomination in the Outstanding Actress in a Short Form Comedy or Drama Series category.

The first series was nominated for two awards at the 70th Primetime Emmy Awards in the categories of Outstanding Short Form Comedy or Drama Series and the Outstanding Actress in a Short Form Comedy or Drama Series for Amram. The series lost to James Corden's Next James Corden, and Amram lost to Christina Pickles.

The second series was nominated for two awards at the 71st Primetime Emmy Awards in the categories of Outstanding Short Form Comedy or Drama Series and the Outstanding Actor in a Short Form Comedy or Drama Series for Patton Oswalt.

The first series aired on IFC on September 17, 2018 to counterprogram the 70th Primetime Emmy Awards.

Cast
 Megan Amram (Seasons 1–2)
 Patton Oswalt (Season 2)

Guest appearances

 J. J. Abrams
 Rachel Axler
 Awkwafina (Season 2)
 Kate Berlant (Season 2)
 Alex Borstein (Season 2)
 D'Arcy Carden
 James Corden (Season 2)
 Ted Danson
 John Early (Season 2)
 Nathan Fielder (Season 2)
 Leslie Grossman (Season 2)
 Rian Johnson
 Jimmy Kimmel
 Andrew Law (Season 2)
 Phil Lord and Christopher Miller (Season 2)
 Natasha Lyonne (Season 2)
 Ira Madison III (Seasons 1–2)
 Audra McDonald (Season 2)
 Lin-Manuel Miranda (Season 2)
 Mandy Moore (Season 2)
 Natalie Morales (Season 2)
 John Mulaney (Season 2)
 Megan Mullaly (Season 2)
 Cliff Murray (Seasons 1–2)
 Nick Offerman (Season 2)
 Kaitlin Olson (Season 2)
 Brian Polk (Seasons 1–2)
 Retta (Season 2)
 Alison Rich (Seasons 1–2)
 Seth Rogen
 RuPaul
 Shannon Woodward (Seasons 1–2)
 Alan Yang

Episodes

Season 1 (2018)

Season 2 (2019)

Awards and nominations

References

External links
 
 
 An Emmy for Megan on Emmys.com

2018 web series debuts
American comedy web series